Nikiforovo is a rural locality (a village) in Mayskoye Rural Settlement, Vologodsky District, Vologda Oblast, Russia. The population was 28 as of 2002.

Geography 
Nikiforovo is located 11 km northwest of Vologda (the district's administrative centre) by road. Sulinskoye is the nearest rural locality.

References 

Rural localities in Vologodsky District